Afternoon of a Nymph is an episode of the British Armchair Theatre series made by the ITV franchise holder ABC Weekend TV and first broadcast by the ITV network on 30 September 1962. It was written by Robert Muller and features Janet Munro and Ian Hendry in the lead roles. It was directed by Philip Saville and produced by Sydney Newman.

The second of Muller's seven plays for Armchair Theatre, Mark Duguid writes: "Although it lacks the cynical bite of, say, Alexander Mackendrick's The Sweet Smell of Success (US, 1957), Muller's script convincingly evokes the sordid shallows of showbiz." A contemporary reviewer, Maurice Wiggins in The Sunday Times described the play negatively as being "a pretentious affair".

Hendry and Munro married in 1963.

References

External links
 

1962 television plays
ITV television dramas
Black-and-white British television shows
Films directed by Philip Saville
Armchair Theatre
Television shows produced by ABC Weekend TV